Enrique Márquez may refer to:

Enrique Macaya Márquez (born 1934), an Argentine sports journalist
Enrique Marquez Jr., an American convert to Islam investigated after the 2015 San Bernardino attack
Enrique Márquez Jaramillo (born 1950), a Mexican poet, historian, and politician
Enrique Márquez Climent (born 1989), a Spanish footballer nicknamed "Kike"